Fahad Al-Otaibi (born 28 September 1975) is a Kuwaiti swimmer. He competed in the 1996 Summer Olympics.

References

1975 births
Living people
Swimmers at the 1996 Summer Olympics
Kuwaiti male swimmers
Olympic swimmers of Kuwait
Swimmers at the 1998 Asian Games
Asian Games competitors for Kuwait